Redcliffe is a town and suburb in the Moreton Bay Region, Queensland, Australia. It also refers colloquially to the Redcliffe Peninsula as a whole, a peninsula jutting into Moreton Bay which contains several other suburbs. Since the 1880s, Redcliffe has been a popular seaside resort in South East Queensland.

Geography 
Redcliffe is situated in the east north-east of the Redcliffe Peninsula on the western shore of the Moreton Bay. It serves as the Central Business District for the Redcliffe Peninsula and its surrounding suburbs.

History 

Before European settlement, the Redcliffe Peninsula was occupied by the Ningy Ningy people. The Aboriginal name is Kau-in-Kau-in, which means Blood-Blood (red-like blood).

A famous Ningy Ningy Bora ring structure, consisting of two separate rings, large and small, joined by a ritual pathway, once existed between Kippa-Ring and Anzac Avenue. Aboriginals as far away as Noosa would travel there to perform initiation ceremonies. It was razed by the Council around 1950.

The town's name originates from "Red Cliff Point" named by the explorer Matthew Flinders, referring to the red cliffs at Woody Point. Redcliffe became Queensland's first colony in 1824; however, it was soon abandoned for Brisbane.

Redcliffe holds the distinction of being the first European settlement in Queensland, first visited by Matthew Flinders on 17 July 1799. Explorer John Oxley recommended "Red Cliff Point"  – named after the red-coloured cliffs visible from Moreton Bay –  to the Governor Thomas Brisbane for the new Moreton Bay penal colony, reporting that ships could land at any tide and easily get close to the shore.

The penal colony was established at Redcliffe on 13 September 1824, under the command of Lieutenant Henry Miller with 14 soldiers, some with wives and children, and 29 convicts. This settlement lead to the establishment of Brisbane, now Queensland's capital city.

Redcliffe became a pastoral district in the 1860s and in the 1880s boomed as a seaside resort town. In 1878, a suburban subdivision called Portwood Estate (around the present day Portwood Street, Sheehan Street, and Sylvin Street) was offered for sale, with the lots described as "large, elevated, picturesque, salubrious, with rare perspective" in Humpy Bong which was to be "the fashionable watering place of the future!". The estate map shows the Redcliffe railway line terminating at a railway station just to the north-east of the estate (in the area of present-day Macnaughton Street). However, the Redcliffe Peninsula railway line was not opened until October 2016 (138 years later) and the terminus was located in neighbouring Kippa-Ring.
In October 1881, approximately 60 allotments of "Ramsgate Estate" were advertised to be auctioned for sale by Arthur Martin & Co, being subdivisions 1 to 60, of portion 205 in the Parish of Redcliffe.

Redcliffe State School opened circa 1888. It closed in 1909 when a new Humpybong State School was opened on a central site to amalgamate Redcliffe State School and the old Humpybong State School.

From 1911, the twin screw excursion steamer Koopa made regular trips to Redcliffe jetty. The principal route for passengers was a steamer from Sandgate pier to Woody Point Pier.  The Hornibrook Bridge connecting Clontarf in the Town of Redcliffe to Brighton in City of Brisbane was completed in 1935 and allowed easy access to and from Brisbane by motor car leading the way to rapid suburban development. That led to the cessation of the Sandgate to Woody Point steamers.

Our Lady Help of Christians School opened in January 1922. It closed on 24 May 1995.

In 1937 a Presbyterian church was built on Prince Edward Parade at Queen's Beach near Eversleigh Road. It was officially opened on Saturday 18 December 1937 by the Reverend James Gibson, Moderator of the Presbyterian Church of Queensland; the ceremony was attended by William Forgan Smith, the Queensland Premier, and Alfred H. Langdon, Mayor of Redcliffe. The two lots of land for the church had been purchased on 29 April 1920, adjacent to the Queensland Presbyterian Women's Missionary Union house, "The Haven".

Redcliffe State High School No 2045 opened on 3 February 1958.
  
In 1958, the Gibb family from Manchester, England emigrated to this area and called it home for a period. Barry, Robin and Maurice Gibb went on to form the highly successful music group, The Bee Gees. In 1959, Brisbane based Speedcar driver Bill Goode, the promoter of the Redcliffe Speedway (located at the Redcliffe Showgrounds) hired the brothers to entertain the crowds at the speedway from the back of a truck during the interval. This was the first ever public performance by the trio. In a letter to the Redcliffe Museum in 1999, Barry Gibb wrote "The smell of the oil, the noise and the atmosphere was incredible. This was the first public appearance Robin, Maurice and I ever made in Australia. We sang through the PA system and people threw money onto the track, and we met Brisbane's leading DJ and racing car driver Bill Gates, who suggested we call ourselves the BG's and even played our songs on his radio show, "Swinging' Gates' Platter Chatter". Hence Redcliffe became the birthplace of the Bee Gees."

Redcliffe Opportunity School opened on 2 March 1964. In 1989, it was renamed Redcliffe State Special School.

The first high-rise apartment building was constructed along Marine Parade in 1974. For decades the interest for similar development was limited – until 2000 there were only four apartment buildings higher than 6 stories across the entire Peninsula. Renewed interest in Redcliffe as a seaside lifestyle precinct occurred in the 2000s and 2010s and as a result high rise and mix use development is found in all areas of Redcliffe along the coastline.

In 1975, the toll on the Hornibrook Highway was removed.

The current Redcliffe Library opened in 2000.

Demographics
The median age of the Redcliffe population was 44 years of age, 7 years above the Australian median. Children aged under 15 years made up 15.5% of the population and people aged 65 years and over made up 20.7% of the population.  68.4% of people living in Redcliffe were born in Australia, compared to the national average of 69.8%; the next most common countries of birth were England 7%, New Zealand 6.3%, Scotland 1%, Philippines 0.8%, Netherlands 0.7%.  86.8% of people spoke only English at home; the next most popular languages were 0.5% Italian, 0.4% Tagalog, 0.4% German, 0.3% Dutch, 0.3% Samoan.

Heritage listings 
Redcliffe has a number of heritage-listed sites, including:
 Anzac Memorial Avenue
corner of Klingner Road and Oxley Avenue: Redcliffe State High School buildings
 395 Oxley Avenue: Redcliffe Fire Station
 133-137 Redcliffe Parade: Comino's Arcade
 185 Redcliffe Parade: former Redcliffe Town Council Chambers

Education
Redcliffe Special School is a special primary and secondary (Prep-12) school for boys and girls at Klingner Road. In 2018, the school had an enrolment of 121 students with 33 teachers (28 full-time equivalent) and 46 non-teaching staff (28 full-time equivalent).

Redcliffe State High School is a government secondary (7-12) school for boys and girls at the corner of Klingner Road and Oxley Avenue. In 2018, the school had an enrolment of 1,319 students with 110 teachers (102 full-time equivalent) and 52 non-teaching staff (35 full-time equivalent). It includes a special education program.

There are no mainstream primary schools in Redcliffe. The nearest government primary schools are Scarborough State School in neighbouring Scarborough to the north, Kippa-Ring State School in neighbouring Kippa-Ring to the west, and Humpybong State School in neighbouring Margate to the south.

Attractions and features

Attractions such as Suttons Beach(location of Luna Park Redcliffe (1944 to 1966), Redcliffe Jetty, Settlement Cove Lagoon, Redcliffe Museum, Redcliffe Botanic Gardens, and Redcliffe Showgrounds are all within the suburb of Redcliffe. The entire Redcliffe Parade precinct is home to an abundance of restaurants and eateries. On Sundays, the Redcliffe Markets take place along Redcliffe Parade and in recent years have been a significant event for local businesses with crowds of thousands taking part.

Aside from smaller events, in September each year, Redcliffe celebrates its history as Queensland's first European settlement location with the Redcliffe festival event.  This festival is chiefly held in the Redcliffe CBD with Redcliffe Parade being closed off to traffic for most of the day.  Other attractions as part of this festival include the KiteFest, The Jetty Fiesta, KiteFest Live, and Spring Break Beach Party with ongoing interest from local community groups and sponsors to create larger and more attractive events each year.

A statue and walkway in honour of the Bee Gees was unveiled by Barry Gibb on 14 February 2013. Barry returned to open the second stage of the walkway on 9 September 2015.

The Moreton Bay Regional Council operates a public library at 476 Oxley Avenue.

Sport and recreation 
A number of well-known sporting teams represent the local area, including the Redcliffe City Cyclones and Peninsula Cricket clubs, Sandgate-Redcliffe Gators, Redcliffe Tigers, Peninsula Power FC, and Redcliffe Padres. Most notably, the Redcliffe Dolphins are a famous rugby league team competing in the second-level Queensland Cup, and will field a team in the fully professional NRL from 2023. Redcliffe hosts the only harness racing in Queensland that is North of Brisbane at the Redcliffe Harness Racing & Sporting Club.

Transport 

Redcliffe is well serviced by public transport operated by Translink with most of the buses connecting to trains at Kippa-Ring station or across the Houghton highway to Sandgate station. Buses also travel to nearby North Lakes and Deception Bay.

In 2016 a train line opened that connects the existing Caboolture line at Petrie to Kippa-Ring station. The line services 6 stations including nearby Rothwell and Mango Hill which is located near North Lakes Westfield and IKEA.

Climate

See also
 Redcliffe Peninsula road network

References

External links 

 University of Queensland: Queensland Places: Redcliffe

 
Suburbs of Moreton Bay Region
1824 establishments in Australia
Populated places established in 1824
Convictism in Queensland